Caroline of Hesse-Darmstadt (2 March 1746, Buchsweiler – 18 September 1821, Homburg) was Landgravine consort of Hesse-Homburg by marriage to Frederick V, Landgrave of Hesse-Homburg. She had seven siblings who survived to adulthood and intermarried with most prestigious families.

Early life 
Caroline was born on 2 March 1746 in Buchsweiler. She was the eldest daughter of Louis IX, Landgrave of Hesse-Darmstadt and his wife Countess Palatine Caroline of Zweibrücken-Birkenfeld.

Marriage 
She married Frederick V, Landgrave of Hesse-Homburg on 27 September 1768. The marriage was contracted for diplomatic and political reasons as the symbol of an inheritance dispute between their respective families. Caroline and Frederick V produced many children but their marriage never developed into a personal relationship, and they lived mostly separated lives. Caroline often spent time in the famed little villa that was given to her use in the forest near Homburg.

Issue
 Frederick VI, Landgrave of Hesse-Homburg (1769–1829), married Princess Elizabeth of the United Kingdom (1770–1840)
 Louis William (1770–1839), married Princess Augusta of Nassau-Usingen (1778–1846), divorced in 1805
 Caroline (1771–1854), married Prince Louis Frederick II, Prince of Schwarzburg-Rudolstadt (1767–1807)
 Louise Ulrike (1772–1854), married Prince Charles Günther of Schwarzburg-Rudolstadt (1771–1825)
 Amalie (1774–1846), married Frederick, Hereditary Prince of Anhalt-Dessau (1769–1814)
 Auguste (1776–1871), married Frederick Louis, Hereditary Grand Duke of Mecklenburg-Schwerin (1778–1819)
 Philip (1779–1846), married Rosalie Antonie, Countess of Naumburg, Baroness Schimmelpenninck von der Oye, née Pototschnig (1806–1845)
 Gustav (1781–1848), married Princess Louise of Anhalt-Dessau (1798–1858)
 Ferdinand (1783–1866), the last Landgrave of Hesse-Homburg
 Maria Anna (1785–1846) married Prince Wilhelm of Prussia (1783–1851)
 Leopold (1787–1813), fell in the Battle of Großgörschen

Ancestry

References

|-

1746 births
1821 deaths
House of Hesse-Darmstadt
House of Hesse-Homburg
Daughters of monarchs